Dongju College is a private technical college in Busan, South Korea.  About 110 instructors are employed.

Academics

Dongju College offers instruction in the fields of health and social welfare, hotel and tourism management, early childhood education, information technology, and design.

History
The college was opened in 1978 as Dongju Women's Vocational School (동주여자실업전문학교), with 480 students.  It became a technical college in 1981.

Notable people
Song Seon-mi, actress

See also
List of colleges and universities in South Korea
Education in South Korea

External links
Official school website, in Korean
Official school website, in English

Universities and colleges in Busan
Saha District
Educational institutions established in 1978
1978 establishments in South Korea